Eva Crackles  (1918–2007) was a British botanist and teacher notable for her major contributions to the Atlas of the British Flora, published in 1962.

As a teacher she was Head of Biology at Hull's Malet Lambert School for many years, until 1978. She received an honorary Doctor of Science degree from the University of Hull in 1991. The following year, she was made a Member of the Order of the British Empire (MBE) by Queen Elizabeth II for her work in plant conservation. Crackles was elected Honorary Life member of the Botanical Society of Britain and Ireland in 2000.

Works

References

British botanists
1918 births
2007 deaths
Fellows of the Linnean Society of London
Members of the Order of the British Empire